Solodovka is a rural locality (a selo) in Tsarevskoye Rural Settlement, Leninsky District, Volgograd Oblast, Russia. The population was 389 as of 2010. There are 10 streets.

Geography 
Solodovka is located on the left bank of the Akhtuba River, 20 km southeast of Leninsk (the district's administrative centre) by road. Saray is the nearest rural locality.

References 

Rural localities in Leninsky District, Volgograd Oblast